Anthony Parker (born 1975) is an American retired basketball player.

Anthony Parker may also refer to:

Sports
Tony Parker (born 1982), French-American basketball player who plays in the NBA
Tony Parker (basketball, born 1993), American basketball player
Anthony Parker (American football) (born 1966), American football player for Arizona State and numerous NFL teams
Anthony Parker (Canadian football) (born 1989), Canadian football player
Anthony Parker (defensive back, born 1975) (born 1975), American football player for Weber State, San Francisco 49ers

Other
Anthony Parker (MP) (1657–1693), Member of Parliament (MP) for Clitheroe
Tony Parker (author) (1923–1996), British oral historian
Anthony Ray Parker (born 1958), American actor
Anthony Parker (musician) (born 1980), American hip-hop artist and music label owner